The Western Shugden Society (or WSS) was a campaign group that advocates Dorje Shugden, and which dissolved itself, along with its parent organisation, the International Shugden Community, after a 2015 Reuters investigation determined that the religious sect had the backing of the Chinese Communist Party and had emerged as an instrument in Beijing’s long campaign to undermine support for the Dalai Lama.

Aims
According to their website, the aims of the WSS are
 To free practitioners who rely upon the enlightened deity Dorje Shugden and their families from suffering;
 To restore peace and harmony between Shugden and non-Shugden practitioners;
 To re-establish the common spiritual activities of Shugden and non-Shugden practitioners in Tibetan monasteries;
 To free Buddhism from pollution by politics

Academic views
Robert Barnett of Columbia University is critical of the WSS:

Dissolution
A 2015 Reuters investigation determined "that the religious sect behind the protests has the backing of the Communist Party" and that the "group has emerged as an instrument in Beijing’s long campaign to undermine support for the Dalai Lama". After the Reuters investigation revealed that China backs it, the International Shugden Community halted operations and disbanded.

See also
Dorje Shugden controversy

References

External links
Protests against the Dalai Lama over Dorje Shugden – An interview with  Robert Barnett, Dec 12, 2014

Politics of Tibet
Tibetan Buddhist organizations
New Kadampa Tradition
Dorje Shugden controversy